Mula Gabharu (also Nang Mula) was the daughter of the Ahom king, Supimphaa, and the wife of the Borgohain Phrasengmung. 
She organised women warriors after her husband had fallen in battle against Turbak, an invader sent by the Sultan of Bengal in 1532, and herself fell in the Battle of Kachua. During the battle, women warrior Jayanti, Pamila, Lalita etc. were the companions of Nang Mula.

Biography 
Mula was the daughter of the Ahom king Supimphaa, and the wife of Phrasengmong Borgohain. King of the Ahom kingdom at that time was Suhungmung, her brother. Mula Gabhoru's husband, Phrasengmung, heard that the minister Khunlung and other warriors lost their lives in the hands of Turbak. Mula Gabharu said to Phrasengmung, '[There are] dark clouds in the skies of Assam. To keep the freedom of Assam, [to be] free from the destruction of the enemy, join the war'. Her husband told her, "You are an idol of bravery, whose wife is fearlessness; there will be no fear in his life. Life and death are not bigger than the independence of this country. The shield of self-defense and the weapon of courage is the best shield. During the war, Mulagabhoru gave her hands to her husbands and said, "Be able to protect your country, your own son, and your own wealth and honor with these words."

 Promise to defeat Turbak 
Phrasengmung promised by lighting 101 lamps, a tradition known as Kin Lao'', that he will take the determination of protecting his country, son, awards, and honors. The Ahom soldiers, who wore armors, were themselves unbeatable. Phrasengmung did not get the chance to wear his armor and fought without armor. After seven days of fighting, the news of her husband's death reached Mula Gabhoru. In mourning, she promised to destroy the murderers of her husband. After that, she took a Hengdan and joined the war. On the fourth day of the war, she saw her husband's murderer, the commander Turbak Khan. Seeing her husband's murderer in the war zone, Nang Mula bravely fought with Turbak Khan. But Turbak Khan was a trained fighter and so he killed Mula Gabharu. After her death, the Ahom soldiers were awakened in new strength. Under the leadership of Kanseng Borpatra Gohain, the Ahom soldiers defeated Turbak in the place of Mokh.

Memorials and monuments

School  
Mulagabharu Girl's MES School was established in 1987 in the name of great warrior Mulagabharu. The school is situated in Dichow Botua, Sivasagar, Assam, Postal Code: 785670 India.

Mula Gabharu Day
People of Assam celebrate Mulagabhoru Day on 29 May every year.

Birangana Mula Grabharu Award
Every year Tai Ahom Yuva Parishad (TYPA) held a ceremony on Mula Gabharu Day and give the Birangana Mula Grabharu Award.

Notes

References

 

Indian female royalty
People of the Ahom kingdom
1486 births
1532 deaths
Ahom kingdom
Indian women in war